UCLA Bruins retired numbers may refer to:

UCLA Bruins men's basketball retired numbers
UCLA Bruins football retired numbers